The Louisville Main Library is the main branch of the Louisville Free Public Library, which is a public library system serving the city of Louisville, Kentucky.

Description and history 
The Louisville Main Library is sited at Fourth and York streets, south of Broadway in downtown Louisville. In 1969, a $4 million north building was added to the classicizing Carnegie structure.

References 

 https://www.lfpl.org/branches/main.htm

Library buildings completed in 1906
Local landmarks in Louisville, Kentucky
National Register of Historic Places in Louisville, Kentucky
Carnegie libraries in Kentucky
Beaux-Arts architecture in Kentucky
Main Library
1906 establishments in Kentucky